Elections to Epping Forest Council were held on 1 May 2003.  One third of the council was up for election and the council stayed under no overall control. This election saw the best performance in terms of seats and vote share for the Liberal Democrats.

By-elections

Waltham Abbey North East by-election

Waltham Abbey South West by-election

Results

Broadley Common, Epping Upland & Nazeing

Buckhurst Hill West

Chipping Ongar, Greensted and Marden Ash

Epping Hemnall

Epping Lindsey and Thornwood Common

Grange Hill

Hastingwood, Matching and Sheering Village

Lambourne

Lower Nazeing

Lower Sheering

North Weald Bassett

Roydon

Shelley

Waltham Abbey High Beach

Waltham Abbey Honey Lane

Waltham Abbey North East

Waltham Abbey Paternoster

Waltham Abbey South West

References

2003 Epping Forest election result
Ward results
2003 Council election results

2003
2003 English local elections
2000s in Essex